The U.S. state of Washington has 21 official emblems, as designated by the Washington State Legislature. These symbols, which reflect the history and culture of the state, are often opportunities for politicians to "tie themselves to popular symbols", for teachers to highlight the legislative process to their students, and for lobbyists to "have their products given official designation".

While some of the symbols are unique to Washington, others are used by multiple states. For example, the willow goldfinch (also known as the American goldfinch), Washington's state bird, is also an official symbol for Iowa and New Jersey. Washington's state grass, bluebunch wheatgrass, is also a symbol for the state of Montana. The square dance and apple are commonly used state dances and state foods, respectively. While most states have an official motto and nickname, Washington's motto ("Al-ki", meaning "by and by" in Chinook Jargon) and nickname ("The Evergreen State") have never been officially adopted by the Legislature.

Washington's first official symbol was its flag, adopted in 1923. While some symbols, including the state flower and state seal, were selected before then, they were not adopted by the Legislature until later. Washington's second symbol was western hemlock, selected as the state tree in 1947. Fourteen symbols were added between 1950 and 2000. Five symbols have been adopted in the 21st century. The newest symbol of Washington is state sport, pickleball, which was declared in 2022.

Insignia

Species

Geology

Culture

Unofficial symbols and unsuccessful proposals 
While most states have an official motto and nickname, the Washington Legislature never officially adopted either. "Al-ki", meaning "by and by" in Chinook Jargon, is the state's unofficial motto, first appearing on the territorial seal designed by Lt. J.K. Duncan. Washington was unofficially nicknamed "The Evergreen State" by pioneer and historian C.T. Conover for its abundant evergreen forests.

Several symbols have been proposed for addition to the list of official state symbols but were never adopted. Proposed symbols have included Richard Berry's "Louie Louie" as the state song and Aplets and Cotlets (a confection made from apples and apricots by Liberty Orchards) as the state candy. The designation of sasquatch as the state's official cryptid or monster has been proposed since the 1970s, going as far as a joke proclamation issued by Governor Daniel J. Evans in 1970.

See also

Outline of Washington (state)

References

General
 
 
 
 "About Washington"  HistoryLink

Specific

External links
 

Washington
Symbols of Washington (state)
State symbols